The Insula dell'Ara Coeli is one of the few surviving examples of an insula, the kind of apartment blocks where many Roman city dwellers resided.  It was built during the 2nd century AD, and rediscovered, under an old church, when Benito Mussolini initiated a plan for massive urban renewal of Rome's historic Capitoline Hill neighbourhood.

Research history 
Regarding the archaeological evidence A.M. Colini, I. Gismondi and a detailed description by J.E. Packer were followed by the classical archaeologist Sascha Priester, who has examined the building between 1997 and 2002. He published his detailed results as a case-study within his comprehensive project on the insulae of ancient Rome, collecting and analyzing the archaeological, epigraphic and ancient literary sources.

Archaeological reconstruction of the area 
A.M. Colini and J.E. Packer assumed that the building, today known as the Insula dell'Ara Coeli, was the still preserved part of a multi-storey, four-wing building, that once grouped around an inner courtyard. Analyzing the archeological evidence S. Priester showed, that the south wing, hypothetically assumed by previous researchers, cannot be proven; he proposed a new reconstruction of the entire area: S. Priester differentiated and described the "west building", which today, with the exception of its massive brick facade, is almost entirely covered by the modern Via del Teatro di Marcello. 

The size of this ground floor with its row of shops (tabernae) was up to 400 square meters. In the north of the site stood the "north building" with its ancient staircase, which was filled up again immediately after the excavation. The "east building", now known as Insula dell'Ara Coeli, is the most visible part of this building ensemble today. Instead of an open courtyard, S. Priester reconstructed an alley covered with arches between the "West Building" and "East Building". The portico pillars of the "east building" and the traces of arches as well as corresponding brick pillars of the opposite "west building" served as evidence. Following this reconstruction, the vaulted path (via tecta) as an alley (vicus) coming from the west turned south at the "north building" and then ran between the differently tall buildings of the "west building" and "east building". At least one branch of the path may also have led to the southern facade of the "East Building". By adding the portico to the "east building", the width of the street was reduced to about 3.8 meters; the alley was paved safely in a secondary phase and was finally abandoned as a traffic route in late antiquity.

The floors of the multi-storey apartment building 
Four floors remain.  The ground floor consisted of shops that faced the surrounding streets, with the owners using ladders to access living quarters immediately above.  A mezzanine lay above the shop level.  The two remaining floors seem to have been designed for human residence.  The third floor seemed to be large, spacious apartments.  The fourth floor had a corridor with a series of three room suites leading off of it.  Archaeologist Andrew Wallace-Hadrill suggested that with a little imagination, these suites are comparable to apartments in which many 21st century Roman families live. Archaeologists believe the structure was originally built with at least five stories.

It has been evaluated that the insula romana could host around 380 people.

Bibliography
Filippo Coarelli, Guida archeologica di Roma, Arnoldo Mondadori Editore, Verona 1975.
J.E. Packer, La casa di Via Giulio Romano, BCom 81, 1968/69, 169 ff.
Sascha Priester, Ad summas tegulas. Untersuchungen zu vielgeschossigen Gebäudeblöcken mit Wohneinheiten und insulae im kaiserzeitlichen Rom, L'Erma Di Bretschneider, Roma 2002.

References

External links

, a video flythrough of a photographic 3D model of the building

Ancient Roman buildings and structures in Rome
Tourist attractions in Rome
Deconsecrated Roman Catholic churches in Rome
Destroyed Roman Catholic churches in Rome